Thayambaka or tayambaka is a type of solo chenda performance that developed in the south Indian state of Kerala, in which the main player at the centre improvises rhythmically on the beats of half-a-dozen or a few more chenda and ilathalam players around.

Performance 
Thayambaka, believed to have flourished during the feudal era, spans an average of 90 minutes. It begins at a slow pace before scaling on to a  medium tempo and eventually culminating in high, frenzied speed. It has a skeletal pattern on which the performance progresses, but the main performer has the liberty to improvise and innovate to showcase his grip of rhythm, finesse of techniques and cerebral brilliance. In fact, thayambaka is one chenda concert that allows maximum individual freedom to the main player.

Thayambaka, like panchavadyam or most chenda melams, is primarily a temple art, but it is also performed outside shrines—like on proscenium stages, open fields or pageantry grounds. As a ritual temple art, thayambaka is performed mostly at the annual festivals soon after the sunset ritual of deeparadhana inside the sanctum sanctorum, following which the deity is brought to the nadappura (open hall inside the temple precincts). In such cases too, artful exhibition of skills remain prominent, yet the performance is regarded as an offering to the presiding god/goddess. Like any art, thayambaka has its connoisseurs huddled around, listening to every beat of the player and judging them critically.

Over the past half a century or so, there have also been thayambaka performances with more than one main player. If they total two, it is called double thayambaka; and if they are three, it is called triple thayambaka. Rarely, there is also the pancha thayambaka, featuring five main chenda players in a row. One of the earliest to design and execute a double thayambaka was Prof.M N Nambudiripad of Moothiringode Mana near Pattambi. He was a percussionist, a photographer, an electronics engineer and a connoisseur of all art forms. According to Sri Kanhoor Krishnan Nambudiripad, Thrithala Kunhikrishna Poduval and Kodalil Gopi Poduval were the first to perform under the guidance of Prof Nambudiripad at Moothiringode Mana. The second performance was at Pulamanthole temple, near Pattambi.

Thayambaka, like any major percussion art in India, is largely a male domain, though of late it has a handful of women practitioners as well. Also, thayambaka is occasionally performed on the mizhavu, an instrument that provides support to koodiyattam and koothu performances, besides idakka and less common instruments like villu. Certain patterns of rhythmic rolls in the thayambaka have influenced the taniyavartanam, the 20-minute-or-so instrumental concert on Carnatic music concerts, where mridangam plays the lead role.

Prominent schools 
Thayambaka, which predominantly developed in central Kerala, has two major schools—called Malamakkavu and Palakkad. The Malamakkavu school is known for its measured progression and grammatical purity, especially in the initial Pathikaalam stage. The Palakkad school revels in imagination and lays emphasis on an improvisation-filled Kooru besides a prolonged yet patterned irikida.

It is another matter that thayambaka manifests itself with subtle changes in patterns and overall aesthetics in all the places it has developed over the years—from northern Travancore to the erstwhile provinces of Kochi and Kozhikode.

Leading masters 
Thayambaka today has its masters ranging from veterans to youngsters. To name a few, they include Sadanam Vasudevan, Kalloor Ramankutty Marar, Pallassana Ponnukutta Marar, Kalamandalam Balaraman, Mattannur Sankarankutty Marar, Kalamandalam Prabhakara Poduval, Thriprangodu Parameswaran Marar, Cheranalloor Sankarankutty Marar, Kallekkulangara Achuthankutty Marar, Sukapuram Radhakrishnan, Manjeri Haridas, Mattannur Sivaraman Marar, Pallavur Sreekumar, Manjeri Haridas, Kalamandalam Gopakumar, Kadannappilly Sankarankutty, Payyavur Narayana Marar, Porur Haridas, Porur Unnikrishnan, Kalpathy Balakrishnan, Cheruthazham Chandran, Kalamandalam Devarajan, Arangottukara Sivan, Athaloor Sivan, Kalanilayam Udayan Namboodiri, Dileep Sukapuram, Alamkode Manikandan, Kallur jayan Thrithala Kesavadas-Sankarakrishnan, Chendamangalam Unnikrishna Marar, Kanhangad Muraleedhara Marar, Thiruvalla Radhakrishnan, Guruvayur Haridas, Guruvayur Sasi, Thrithala Sreeni, Mannarkkad Hari, Mannarkkad Mohanan, Peruvanam Kuttan Marar, Peruvanam Satheesan Marar, Vellinezhi Anand, Panamanna Sasi, Sadanam Ramakrishnan, Neeleshwaram Santhosh Marar, Nandakumar, Pramodkumar, Mattannur Srikanth-Sriraj, Cherpulassery Rajesh, Jayan and Vijayan, Kanhangad (Madiyan Kovilakam) Radhakrishna Marar Kandalloor Sadasiavan, Kandalloor Unnikrishnan, Chovallur Mohana Variar and Kalanilayam Ratheesh, Ethanur Krishnadas.

The late masters of the modern age, say from the 1950s, include Malamakkavu Kesava Poduval, Thiruvegappura Rama Poduval and Thiruvegappura Shankunni Poduval, Pallassana Padmanabha Marar, Menapram Kunhirama Marar (Melapramani at Thiruvangadu Sriramaswamy temple), Thiyyadi (Narayanan) Nambiar, Thrithala Kunhikrishna Poduval, Pallavur Appu Marar, Alipparambu Sivarama Poduval, Thrithala Kesava Poduval, Peruvanam Appu Marar, Pallavur Kunhukuttan Marar, Kodulil Gopi Poduval, Pookkattiri Divakara Poduval, Neettiyathu Govindan Nair, Mulangunnathukavu Appukutta Kurup, Angadippuram Krishnadas, Kottakkal Kuttan Marar, Nileswaram Balakrishna Marar and Sadanam Divakara Marar.

Women and the current change of trend in traditional views 
Although it is an art form dominated by men, a few women have stepped up into the limelight. The most prominent and famous among them being Tripunithura Nandini Varma, a young artist who received a prestigious award for the best upcoming talent at a recent event held at Kottakkal.

References 
 Killius, Rolf. Ritual Music and Hindu Rituals of Kerala. New Delhi: BR Rhythms, 2006.  (with author's permission).
 Paul, G. S. "Pulse of the chenda". The Hindu Friday, 8 August 2008.

Notes

External links 

 Melam Collections
 Thayambaka - Kallur Ramankutty

Kerala music
Arts of Kerala